The Marble Cone Fire was a wildland fire which burned for three weeks in August, 1977 in the Santa Lucia Mountains high country, at the Big Sur area of Monterey County, California. The fire burned 90% of the vegetation cover in the upper Big Sur River watershed. This posed the threat of serious flooding in the Big Sur River Valley, where a much smaller August 1972 fire had led to severe flooding later that year. This time, the rains were moderate and resulted in no major flooding problems.

References

External links
"Changes in Distribution of Owl Species Subsequent to Habitat Alteration by Fire", Bruce Elliot, California Department of Fish and Game Western Birds 16:25-28, 1985
"Burn Species", David Rogers, Double Cone Quarterly, Spring 2000

Wildfires in Monterey County, California
1977 fires in the United States
1977 in California
1970s wildfires in the United States
Monterey Ranger District, Los Padres National Forest
Santa Lucia Range
1977 natural disasters in the United States
August 1977 events in the United States
Big Sur